General Kellogg may refer to:

Daniel Kellogg (judge) (1791–1875), Vermont Militia adjutant general
George Bradley Kellogg (1826–1875), Vermont Militia adjutant general
Keith Kellogg (born 1944), U.S. Army lieutenant general